Philip Marmion, 5th and last Baron Marmion of Tamworth (died 1291) was King's Champion and Sheriff. He was descended from the lords of Fontenay-le-Marmion in Normandy, who are said to have been hereditary champions of the Dukes of Normandy.

Career

Philip was High Sheriff of Warwickshire and Leicestershire in 1249, and of Norfolk and Suffolk in 1261, having also been summoned to Parliament in that year.

He served in Poitou in 1254, and was imprisoned when on his way home through France at Pons.

Philip was one of the sureties for the king in December 1263 and was one of his leading supporters at the Battle of Northampton in April 1264. He was taken prisoner at the Battle of Lewes on 14 May 1264.

He died before 5 December 1291 when an Inquisition post mortem was held.

Family and descendants

Marmion first married Joan de Kilpec, daughter and heiress of Hugh (de la Mare) Kilpec, Baron of Kilpeck, by his wife Mazera, with whom he had the following issue:

 Mazera, m. Ralph de Cromwell and their daughter Joan (b.abt 1268) m. Alexander de Freville.
 Joan, (b.abt 1256) m. William de Morteyn but died with no issue.
 Maud, (b.abt 1262) m. Ralph le Botiller (Butler) of Wemme (son of Ralph Botiller and Maud Pantulph).

He married secondly, Mary (perhaps Cantilupe), (Inq P.M. 1315) who bore him:

 Joan, (b.abt 1284) m1. Thomas de Ludlow and, m2. Henry Hillary (-1349).
He also had a lovechild with a mistress whose identity is not known:-

 Robert, m. Isabel daughter and heir of Giles Fitz Ralph having a single daughter, Avice, m1. Eustace de Hardreshull and m2. John de Whitacre

Tamworth passed to Joan Cromwell, daughter of Mazera Marmion, and wife of Alexander de Freville, and Scrivelsby eventually passed with Margaret de Ludlow to Sir John Dymoke, in whose family it has since remained along with the title 'Champion of England'.  Maud (Marmion) Butler was heiress of Pulverbatch, Middleton and Norbury.

References

Notes

External links
 Images of Philip and Lady Marmion's effigy in Scrivelsby church
 Inquisition Post Mortem of Philip Marmion #29, dated 1291-2.

Year of birth unknown
1291 deaths
13th-century English people
Medieval English knights
High Sheriffs of Warwickshire
High Sheriffs of Leicestershire
High Sheriffs of Norfolk
High Sheriffs of Suffolk
High Sheriffs of Nottinghamshire
High Sheriffs of Derbyshire
Anglo-Normans
English people of French descent
English people of Belgian descent
People from Tamworth (district)
Sheriffs of Warwickshire